Chester F. "Chet" Dobis is a Democratic member of the Indiana House of Representatives, representing the 13th District since 1970. He has served as Speaker Pro Tempore.

External links
Indiana State Legislature - Representative Chet Dobis Official government website
Project Vote Smart - Representative Chester F. 'Chet' Dobis (IN) profile
Follow the Money - Chester F Dobis
2006 2004 2002 2000 1998 1996 1994 campaign contributions

Democratic Party members of the Indiana House of Representatives
1942 births
Living people
People from Merrillville, Indiana